Poncho Balón (also known as Poncho Football in English) is a series of Mexican animated television shorts that ran on Canal 5 during the 2006 FIFA World Cup. It aired a total of 31 shorts. The show stars Humberto Vélez as the title character, who is best known for dubbing Homer Simpson in the Spanish-language version of The Simpsons.

The series was produced by Ánima Estudios and Estación Espacial and was created by Carlos Cuarón, René Castillo, Juan Elias Tovar, and Luis Usablaca.

Plot
The plot revolves on a clumsy, dim-witted, anthropomorphic soccer ball, named Poncho, who's trying to achieve his dreams of playing for the 2006 World Cup Final in Germany. As he journeys around the world, he faces a series of shenanigans and failed attempts while reaching to his final destination.

Broadcast history
Poncho Balón is broadcast on the following stations worldwide:

Feature film adaptation
Due to successful ratings, co-creators and producers, René Castillo and Luis Usabiaga, have announced that a 3D computer animated feature film based on the television shorts is in development. The producers also said they wanted to achieve the similar success with Pixar movies and possibly earn an Academy Award nomination with this film. It will be set during the 2014 FIFA World Cup in Brazil. Originally planned for a 2012 and 2014 release, the film is currently in production and was expected to be released sometime in 2015, produced by Kaxan Animation in Guadalajara, produced in English. It is currently unknown if Ánima Estudios, the producer of the television shorts, will be involved in the project.

References

External links
Official Website (in Spanish)

2006 Mexican television series debuts
Mexican flash animated television series
Canal 5 (Mexico) original programming
2000s Mexican television series
2006 FIFA World Cup
Association football television series
Ánima Estudios television series